The Tucker Unit is a prison in Dudley Lake Township, unincorporated Jefferson County, Arkansas,  northeast of Pine Bluff. It is operated by the Arkansas Department of Correction (ADC). Tucker is one of the state of Arkansas's "parent units" for male prisoners; it serves as one of several units of initial assignment for processed male prisoners. It is in proximity to, but not within, the Tucker census-designated place.

A Maximum Security Unit was constructed a short distance north of the Tucker Unit in 1983.

History

In 1933 Governor of Arkansas Junius Marion Futrell closed the Arkansas State Penitentiary ("The Walls"), and some prisoners moved to Tucker from the former penitentiary. In the process the designated execution chamber moved to Tucker. "Old Sparky", in operation within the state system from 1926 to 1948, was the equipment used to kill condemned prisoners at Tucker. In 1964 Charles Fields was executed at Tucker; he was the last prisoner to be executed at Tucker before the Arkansas death penalty was declared against the U.S. constitution. In history, the prison housed the state's white convicts. In addition the prison housed some black female prisoners.

In 1967 four men escaped from the unit and abandoned a vehicle used in the escape in Fort Scott, Kansas.

The Arkansas prison scandal occurred in the unit and involved the "Tucker Telephone." Due to the notoriety of the device, as of 2000 visitors to the Tucker Unit on a regular basis ask the warden if the telephone on his/her desk is the "Tucker Telephone."

In 1974 death row inmates, previously at the Tucker Unit, were moved to the Cummins Unit. In 1978 a new death chamber opened in Cummins, so Tucker was no longer the place of execution in Arkansas. In 1986 male death row inmates were moved to the Maximum Security Unit. On Friday August 22, 2003, all 39 Arkansas death row inmates, all of them male, were moved to the Supermax at the Varner Unit.

In 2000 the ADC's final 100 person barracks was split into two smaller barracks.

In 2009 prison guards left a prisoner in his own feces for a weekend. The prisoner had to be hospitalized. The Associated Press discovered that prison guards had received lap dances while working. The prison system fired several correctional employees. The same year, a Heber Springs, Arkansas man who was wanted for not reporting to his parole officer appeared at the Tucker Unit. A prison guard shot him dead. Dina Tyler, a spokesperson for the prison system, said that the man crashed his car into the car owned by the assistant warden and was "very close to the officers" prior to his death.

On August 7, 2017 a group of prisoners held guards hostage, but later released them.

Composition and operations

The Tucker Unit and the Maximum Security Unit are in Dudley Lake Township.

Of the land at the Tucker Unit,  are used to farm rice and soybeans.

The unit houses a campus of the Riverside Vocational Technical School. Education in the Tucker Unit began in 1968, when the England School District started a night program.

ADC officials believe that the Island of Hope Chapel was the first freestanding prison chapel in the Southern United States. It was originally dedicated in November 1969 and, after a renovation, rededicated on May 13, 2011. Its original construction was financed by a total of $80,000 donated by Johnny Cash and various other persons. The prison has a sloping ceiling and a plexyglas fauxleaded window behind the altar, and it is made of cinder blocks. Prior to the renovation the prison had issues with rainwater leaking into the structure. The renovation, which included constructing a new roof; adding finishes to floors, pews, and walls; and installing new panes of glass, had a price of $175,000. The ADC may finance repairs and maintenance, but as per the Establishment Clause of the United States Constitution it cannot build a new religious facility.

In historical eras, white prisoners worked in the fields, and the prison housed clothing, license plate, and shoe factories.

As of 2009, 532 prisoners live in the Maximum Security Unit. That year, of the prisoners, 100 live in a barrack-style dormitory and have jobs in the prison.

Drug-related deaths 
Arkansas' prisons, including Tucker, have experienced a rash of inmates dying of drug overdoses while serving their prison sentence behind bars in the year 2018. This phenomenon is not just isolated in Arkansas but rather nation-wide. The drugs have been thought to be either fentanyl or synthetic marijuana. Varner Unit, Tucker's sister unit, experienced five drug-related inmate deaths in a four-day span during August 2018. Dan Shelton, who was 54 years old serving a 40-year sentence for kidnapping, burglary, and others, was the second of two inmates at Tucker who died in the same week during October 2018. The other inmate, Harrison Flanery, was 46 years old and serving a 14-year sentence which began in 2014 for sexual assault.

Notable prisoners

Maximum Security Unit prisoners
Non-death row
 Davis Carpenter, perpetrator of the murder of Jesse Dirkhising
Heath Stocks, pleaded guilty to the murder of his family in 1997.

Death row and non-death row
 West Memphis 3 (all released from prison)

Death row:
 Richard Snell - Executed in 1995
 Ronald Gene Simmons - Executed in 1990

References

External links

 "Tucker Unit." Arkansas Department of Corrections
 "Tucker Unit" entry from the Encyclopedia of Arkansas History & Culture 
 Shaw, Robert L. "Inmates of Arkansas Prison Disclose Stories of Torture, Beatings, Extortion." Associated Press at Nashua Telegraph. Wednesday January 18, 1967. Second Section p. 21. Retrieved from Google News (21/36).

Buildings and structures in Jefferson County, Arkansas
Prisons in Arkansas
Capital punishment in Arkansas
1916 establishments in Arkansas